The Life of Rufus Dawes is a 1911 Australian silent film based on Alfred Dampier's stage adaptation of the 1874 novel For the Term of His Natural Life produced by Charles Cozens Spencer.

It was also known as The Story of Rufus Dawes, or the Term of His Natural Life or The Convict Hero.

The film was the third produced by Charles Cozens Spencer, based on a popular stage adaptation by Alfred Dampier and starring Alfred Rolfe, his wife Lily Dampier and Raymond Longford. The others were Captain Midnight, the Bush King (1911) and Captain Starlight, or Gentleman of the Road (1911). Rolfe then left Spencer to work for the Australian Photo-Play Company under Stanley Crick.

It is considered a lost film.

Synopsis
The film was divided into sections:
ENGLAND – A room at Hampstead heath – Sir Richard Devine refuses to be blackmailed by Crofton, alias John Rex – The Scapepgrace Dick Devine quarrels with his father, Sir Richard Devine is cast off forever – Sir Richard awaiting Parson North is murdered by Rex – North discovers the body and secures his own forged bills – Dick, accused of murder gives his name as Rufus Dawes – Parson North denounces Rex as a notorious highwayman.
VAN DIEMEN'S LAND – the convict settlement at Hell's Gate; life on the chain gang; Gabbet's escape and capture; the Rev. Meakin visits his flock; Chaplain North gives the convicts tobacco; Lt Frere threatens to report him; Major Vickers announces the move to Port Arthur; the attack by the convicts; the prisoner Troke saved by North; the departure from the settlement.
THE MUTINY – on board the Osprey; the capture of the Osprey; the mutineers maroon the survivors
WRECK OF THE OSPREY – the morning after.
MAROONED – two weeks later Rufus Dawes saved by Sylvia Vickers. Rex, Crow and Gabbett starving, draw lots to decide who should be killed. The Ruffian Gabbett. Three months. Rufus Dawes builds a boat of goat skins to enable Mrs Vickers and Sylvia to escape from the island. Major Vickers and party search for the castaways. Rev Meekin's morning walk interrupted by Gabbet. Mrs Vickers killed by Gabbett. The shock deprives Sylvia of her memory. Lt Frere accuses Rufus Dawes of the crime.
PORT ARTHUR – Dawes escapes from prison. Sylvia Vickers, now Mrs Frere, fails to recognise him at first but then it comes back. Her memory returning she demands to see him. Major Vickers returns with recaptured convicts. Lady Devine arrives to see her son.
THE END – Rex and Gabbett confess to the murders of Sir Richard and Mrs Vickers. His innocence established and a pardon for Rufus Dawes.

Unlike the original novel and 1908 film version, this had a happy ending. This was in line with Spencer's version of Robbery Under Arms which had a happier ending than the original novel.

Cast
Alfred Rolfe as Rufus Dawes
Lily Dampier as Sylvia
Raymond Longford as Gabbett
Lottie Lyell
Stanley Walpole
Augustus Neville

Original Play
The film was based on a stage play adaptation of the novel which Dampier had performed in.

First Version of Play

Dampier originally did a version of the play in the 1880s where he played Reverend North. The play was adapted by Thomas Walker using the name "Thomas Somers". (Walker later became a speaker for the West Australian Parliament.)

The structure of the play was as follows:
Prologue-England, 1827. The "Spaniards" Inn, Hampstead, Winter – with Rev North, Maurice Frere, Richard Devine, Lady Devine, Sarah Rex – ending in "The Murder in the Snow"
Then the rest of the play set in Van Dieman's Land 1830-37:
Tableaux 1 ; Convict Settlement at Sarah Island – The Cannibal's Return – The Smuggled "Wood" and its Consequences – The Story of Two Birds of Prey-  Revolt of the Convicts – I'll teach you to flog a man on gruel – The Broad Arrow.
Tableaux 2 : After the Revolt – The Island – The Surprise Hunger and Solitude have tamed me, Sir. Scene 2 : Another part of the Island – Lost in the Bush – The Alan-eaters – The Lottery of Death. Scene 3 : Near the Sea – The Coracle – A Mother's Death – Sylvia's Loss of Memory – The Accusation – Destiny in His Hands.
Tableaux 3: Hobart Town – Exterior of Frere's Residence – The Rev. Mr. North's Dilemma – And, this Is Sylvia's Husband – Forsaken – "The Day will come when I'll prove myself your friend,"
Tableaux 4 : England – Lady Devine's Town House – Lady Devine and Sarah Rex – The claimant- 'This man maybe your husband, but he is not my son" – The Confession – The Arrest – The Claimant's Future – Norfolk Island.
Tableau 5 : Norfolk Island – The Prison Yard – North's Failing – The Demon Drink – Remorse- 'Our smallest sins have ghosts that haunt us like tho Spirits of Murdered Men" – The Rack "One Hundred Lashes. "
Tableaux 6: The Condemned Cell. Scene 2: That Brutal Face – Sylvia Regains her Memory. REDEMPTION.

It originally ran for only a week at the Alexandra Theatre in Melbourne, and had an unsuccessful revival there in 1890 and in Sydney in 1893.

Rival Versions
Dampier's production of the novel was not the only one available to audiences at the time. In 1886 there was a production adapted by George Leitch In 1887 there was another production in Sydney based on an adaptation by "T. South". Walter Baker also did an adaptation. However Dampier's was allegedly the only production which paid a royalty to Clarke's widow.

Second Version of Play

Dampier later worked on another version with Thomas Walker which had a more successful run in Sydney in 1895, with Rolfe playing Rufus Dawes, Alfred Dampier as Reverend North, and Lily Dampier as Sylvia Vickers. The play structured the story to emphasise the role of Reverend North.

The critic from the Sydney Morning Herald described it as:
Inferior to Robbery Under Arms [another novel adapted by Dampier] as regards dialogue and construction, the characters are for the most part the merest puppets of melodrama, and the dramatic situations are far from convincing. Against all this, on the other hand, the play has to its credit the advantage of an intricate plot clearly set out, of rapid action of a sensational kind and two of three beautiful tableaux – elements of good which caused it to be welcomed on Saturday with the most extravagant expressions of delight.
This play was often revived over the next few years. Alfred Dampier's last performance on stage was as Reverend North in a production of the play on 10 November 1905.

The play was still being revived in 1912 and 1913.

Production
It is likely the film was retitled to avoid confusion with another movie version of the novel that had been released in 1908.

Raymond Longford worked on the movie and later claimed to have been the actual director.

It appears from contemporary reviews that there was some filming at Port Arthur.

Scenes involving Raymond Longford, who played Gabbett, were shot at La Perouse, Sydney. According to a later article in Everyone's:
Longford, stripped to the waist, tattered and blood bespattered, was at the head of a cliff many yards away from the camera and the rest of the company, who were preparing to scale the cliff to attempt his capture. Longford forgot that he would be visible to those on the other side of the cliff, and was startled to hear a   piercing shriek and turned in time to see a woman on the beach below, running as though for her life. He signalled to the others to stop the action, which they did, thinking that something had gone wrong. Longford then turned around to see it he could appease the woman’s alarm. She was not to be seen, but creeping towards him in single file he saw some fishermen and stragglers, armed with sticks, oars and any handy weapon. The position looked ugly, and he reckoned he was in for a bad time, so rising to his feet, he gave a hail, intending  to reassure the attackers that all was well. As soon as they caught sight of him and his accrutrements they dropped their weapons and incontinently fled. After that scouts were posted around the locations to warn sightseers what they might expect to see.

Release
The film was released in Sydney on 19 June 1911 at the Broadway Theatre. It was released in Melbourne on 27 November 1911 at the Olympic Theatre. It debuted in Launceston on 22 January 1912. (During the Launceston season, the film caught fire one night and the theatre had to be evacuated.)

Distribution of the film was blocked from legal action by Marcus Clarke's daughter, Marion Clarke.

Critical reception
The Sydney Truth called it "a striking production". It was described by The Argus as "an entirely original pictorial adaptation". The Kalgoorlie Miner wrote "the subject is treated magnificently, and every detail is perfectly carried out."

US Release
It was bought for release in the USA by Sawyers Pictures, who retitled the movie The Convict Hero.

References

Fotheringham, Richard, "Introduction", Robbery Under Arms by Alfred Dampier and Garnet Walch, Currency Press 1985

External links
 
The Life of Rufus Dawes at AustLit

1911 films
1911 lost films
Films set in 1827
Films set in the 1830s
Australian black-and-white films
Australian silent feature films
Lost Australian films
Films directed by Alfred Rolfe
Films based on Australian novels
Australian films based on plays
Films based on adaptations
For the Term of His Natural Life